Campilongo is a surname. Notable people with the surname include:

Antonio Campilongo (1911–?), Argentine footballer
Jim Campilongo (born 1958), American jazz musician
Martín Campilongo (born 1969), Argentine humorist
Salvatore Campilongo (born 1961), Italian footballer and manager